The Journal of Caribbean History is a biannual peer-reviewed academic journal covering the history of the Caribbean. It is published by the University of the West Indies Press. The editor-in-chief is Swithin Wilmot of the University of the West Indies.

References

External links

History of the Caribbean
History of the Americas journals
University of the West Indies
Biannual journals
Multilingual journals
Publications established in 1967
Caribbean studies journals